Elfrid Payton Sr. (born September 22, 1967) is an American former all-star gridiron football player in the Canadian Football League. Payton graduated from Grambling State University.

Career
Payton played with seven different teams over the course of his career.

1991–1993 – Payton played with the Winnipeg Blue Bombers, where he was an all-star and James P. McCaffrey Trophy winner in 1993.

1994 – Payton started the season with the Shreveport Pirates, but finished with the Grey Cup finalist Baltimore CFLers, registering twenty seven tackles and four sacks.

1995 – Payton had eighteen sacks in an all-star season with the Grey Cup champion Baltimore Stallions.

1996–1999 – Payton had three all-star seasons (1997, 1998 and 1999) with the Montreal Alouettes.

2000 – Payton returned to the Winnipeg Blue Bombers.

2001 – Payton was an all-star with the Toronto Argonauts.

2002–2003 – Payton played with the Edmonton Eskimos, where he won the CFL's Most Outstanding Defensive Player Award and was an all star in 2002, and won a Grey Cup in 2003.

2004 – Payton returned to the Winnipeg Blue Bombers.

Payton played in 189 total regular season games, seventeen playoff games, and four Grey Cups. His 154 career sacks are the 2nd highest career total in CFL history.

Post-career
In 2010 Payton was inducted into the Canadian Football Hall of Fame.

Payton's son, also named Elfrid, was a basketball player at the University of Louisiana at Lafayette who won the 2014 Lefty Driesell Award, and now plays for the Phoenix Suns of the National Basketball Association.

References

1967 births
Living people
People from Gretna, Louisiana
American players of Canadian football
Baltimore Stallions players
Canadian football defensive linemen
Canadian Football Hall of Fame inductees
Canadian Football League Most Outstanding Defensive Player Award winners
Edmonton Elks players
Grambling State Tigers football players
Montreal Alouettes players
Shreveport Pirates players
Toronto Argonauts players
Winnipeg Blue Bombers players